South Triangle Pond is a  pond in Plymouth, Massachusetts within the Eel River watershed. The pond is located north of South Pond village in the Plymouth Town Forest, east of Great South Pond and south of Plymouth's main Post Office and The Shops at 5.

External links
South Shore Coastal Watersheds - Lake Assessments
Eel River Watershed Association

Ponds of Plymouth, Massachusetts
Ponds of Massachusetts